This article summarizes several identities in exterior calculus.

Notation 
The following summarizes short definitions and notations that are used in this article.

Manifold 
,  are -dimensional smooth manifolds, where . That is, differentiable manifolds that can be differentiated enough times for the purposes on this page.

,  denote one point on each of the manifolds.

The boundary of a manifold  is a manifold , which has dimension .

Tangent and cotangent bundles 
,  denote the tangent bundle and cotangent bundle, respectively, of the smooth manifold .

Sections of the tangent bundles, also known as vector fields, are typically denoted as  such that at a point  we have . Sections of the cotangent bundle, also known as differential 1-forms (or covector fields), are typically denoted as  such that at a point  we have .

Differential k-forms 

Omitted elements of a sequence 

When we are given  inputs  and a -form  we denote omission of the th entry by writing

Exterior product 

The exterior product is also known as the wedge product. The exterior product of a -form  and an -form  produce a -form . It can be written using the set  of all permutations  of  such that  as

Directional derivative 

The directional derivative of a 0-form  along a section  is a 0-form denoted

Exterior derivative 

The exterior derivative  is defined for all .  We generally omit the subscript when it is clear from the context.

For a -form  we have  as the -form that gives the directional derivative, i.e., for the section  we have , the directional derivative of  along .

For ,

Lie bracket 

The Lie bracket of sections  is defined as the unique section  that satisfies

Tangent maps 

Pull-back 

If  is a smooth map, then the pull-back of a -form  is defined such that for any -dimensional submanifold 

The pull-back can also be expressed as

Interior product 

If  and  then

Metric tensor 

We call  the signature of the metric. A Riemannian manifold has , whereas Minkowski space has .

Musical isomorphisms 

The metric tensor  induces duality mappings between vector fields and one-forms: these are the musical isomorphisms flat  and sharp . A section  corresponds to the unique one-form  such that for all sections , we have:

A one-form  corresponds to the unique vector field  such that for all , we have:

These mappings extend via multilinearity to mappings from -vector fields to -forms and -forms to -vector fields through

Hodge star 

For an n-manifold M, the Hodge star operator  is a duality mapping taking a -form  to an -form .

Co-differential operator 
The co-differential operator  on an  dimensional manifold  is defined by

The Hodge–Dirac operator, is a Dirac operator studied in Clifford analysis.

Oriented manifold 

Volume form 

Area form 

Given a volume form  and a unit normal vector  we can also define an area form  on the

Bilinear form on k-forms 

The -bilinear form for the space of -forms  is defined by

In the case of a Riemannian manifold, each is an inner product (i.e. is positive-definite).

Lie derivative 

We define the Lie derivative  through Cartan's magic formula for a given section  as

It describes the change of a -form along a flow  associated to the section .

Laplace–Beltrami operator 

Important definitions

Definitions on Ωk(M) 

 is called...

 closed if 
 exact if  for some 
 coclosed if 
 coexact if  for some 
 harmonic if closed and coclosed

Cohomology 

The -th cohomology of a manifold  and its exterior derivative operators  is given by

Two closed -forms  are in the same cohomology class if their difference is an exact form i.e.

A closed surface of genus  will have  generators which are harmonic.

Dirichlet energy 

Given , its Dirichlet energy is

Properties

Exterior derivative properties 

 ( Stokes' theorem )

 ( cochain complex )

  for

Exterior product properties 

 ( associativity )

 ( distributivity over addition )

The rank of a -form  means the minimum number of monomial terms (exterior products of one-forms) that must be summed to produce .

Pull-back properties 

 ( commutative with  )

 ( distributes over  )

 ( contravariant )

Musical isomorphism properties

Interior product properties 

 ( nilpotent )

 for 

 for 

 for

Hodge star properties 

 ( inversion )

 ( Hodge dual of constant function 1 is the volume form )

Co-differential operator properties 

 ( nilpotent )

 if  (  adjoint to  )

In general, 

 for

Lie derivative properties 

 ( commutative with  )

 ( commutative with  )

 ( Leibniz rule )

Exterior calculus identities 

 if 

 ( bilinear form )

 ( Jacobi identity )

Dimensions 
If 

 for 

 for 

Exterior products 
Let  and   be vector fields.

Projection and rejection 

 ( interior product  dual to wedge  )

 for 

If , then

 thus  ( projection–rejection decomposition )

Given the boundary  with unit normal vector 

 extracts the tangential component of the boundary.
 extracts the normal component of the boundary.

Sum expressions 

 

 given a positively oriented orthonormal frame .

Hodge decomposition 

If ,  such that

Poincaré lemma 

If a boundaryless manifold  has trivial cohomology , then any closed  is exact. This is the case if M is contractible.

Relations to vector calculus

Identities in Euclidean 3-space 

Let Euclidean metric .

We use  differential operator 

 ( scalar triple product )

 ( cross product )

 if 
 ( scalar product )

 ( gradient )

 ( directional derivative )

 ( divergence )

 ( curl )

 ( divergence theorem )

Lie derivatives 

 ( -forms )

 ( -forms )

 if  ( -forms on -manifolds )

 if  ( -forms )

References 

Calculus
Mathematical identities
Mathematics-related lists
Differential forms
Differential operators
Generalizations of the derivative